The only public high school in Winchester, Kentucky, George Rogers Clark High School opened in the fall of 1963, consolidating Clark County High School and Winchester High School, locally referred to as county high and city high respectively. In 2011 construction began on a new building. In the fall of 2013, and a remarkable 50 years since the opening of the original facility, all student activity and faculty moved to the new facility, keeping the name "George Rogers Clark High School.” The new building has one athletic facility.

The school has a strong record in athletics, celebrating state championships in numerous sports. The most recent victory was in the boys' basketball 2021-22 season, in which the team won the boys state basketball championship at Rupp Arena. The old Clark County High School boys' basketball team won the 1951 Kentucky High School Athletic Association (KHSAA) state title under head coach Letcher Norton. In 1991, the football team won the KHSAA Class AAAA state championship, while the girls' track and field team won the KHSAA Class AAA state title. In 2008, the boys’ varsity soccer team finished as runner up in the state. They came up one game shy of the final four in 2007 and finished in the elite 8 after losing in a shootout. In 1999 and 2013, the boys' golf team finished as runner-up in the state tournament, and continues to make noise in the golf community, with several of its 1999 team members moving on to college golf and semi-pro golf.  The most recent addition to GRC Athletics is the boys' and girls' swim team, which competed in its first season during the 2005-2006 school year. Another very successful team is the Red and White Varsity Cheerleading Squad. The Red Varsity squad was seen as the main squad. This squad cheered at more games and many competitions. These girls were more flexible and could do more difficult stunts. The White Varsity squad also cheered at games and competitions.  Red and White were very successful, winning Eleven State Titles in: 2014,  2006, 2005, 2004, 2003, 2001, 2000, 1999, 1998, 1997, 1996, and 1995 as so as White Varsity. Both Red and White were both considered in the "Large Varsity" division. The squad also typically attends the NCA competition in Dallas, Texas, where they have placed numerous times as well. In 2008 the GRC cheerleader's no longer have a Red or White Varsity, they now had a "Super Varsity", which means there is no longer two teams, there is only one big one. Their motto is "We Are One". In 2009 they attended the UCA competition in Orlando and was ranked 14th in the nation. The Junior Varsity team which was previously excluded in 1999, was recently recreated.  The varsity team has 6 uniforms.  These uniforms were from Red Varsity and White Varsity since both teams shared the same uniforms.  The most famous is the "Red Cardinal" which is a solid white tank and skirt, black under shirt, and a  red cardinal head on the tank.  "Red Cardinal" is mostly worn at football games.  There are three additional uniforms with "GRC" on it in different styles and the one they wear for competitions and championship games is black and has a red "C" in the background and in the foreground are the words "Cards" this is mostly worn at basketball games. The last one is black and has the word "Cardinals" going horizontally across the chest and three red stripes going down the rib cage and on the body suite.  Their uniforms are made by Varsity Brands.  In February 2010, the GRC Varsity won 4th place in Large Varsity Division II at the National High School Cheerleading Championship, the following week, they placed 3rd in state competition in Large Varsity. In 2010-2011 school year they competed in Nationals at the Medium Varsity Division I level place 10th and Medium in state and placing 3rd. In 2014, the George Rogers Clark Varsity squad earned the title of Kentucky State Champions.

The school's band is known as "Kentucky's Finest since 1963."  The band currently has an enrollment of approximately 100 members.  GRC is known as a formidable competitor in such venues as Bands of America, The Contest of Champions, and Kentucky Music Educators Association Sanctioned Contests.  

The GRC Symphonic Band has performed at the Midwest International Band and Orchestra Clinic in Chicago, Illinois (1977) and has competed in Bands of America and National Adjudicators Invitational Concert Festivals. 

While it is not a sport recognized by the KHSAA, cheerleading is popular and very competitive at George Rogers Clark. In 2006, the cheerleading team captured its fourth straight Kentucky Association of Prep Organization Sponsors (KAPOS) state championship. The squad has won 12 of the last 13 state championships in the traditional at-large category.

The school also offers an academic team, which has been successful on multiple levels. In 2019, one student placed in the statewide competition. In 2019 and 2018, the school placed second at the region competition, with several students and their quick recall team advancing to state. The quick recall team placed first in 2019, and second in 2018. In 2017, the school placed third at the region competition, and third in quick recall. The school has also placed well in previous years. 

The school's Mock Trial team has also competed at a state level. 

GRC's Gay-Straight Alliance (GSA) has allowed students to feel more safe, and participated in the Day of Silence in 2021. 

The school offers multiple  AP courses, including AP Psychology, AP Art History, AP Human Geography, AP Biology, AP World History, AP Calculus AB, AP Music Theory, AP Literature, AP Language, and others. They also offer many pre-AP classes.

Notable alumni
Yeremiah Bell - NFL defensive back drafted by the Miami Dolphins in 2003 and selected to the 2009 Pro Bowl team.
Matt Ginter - MLB pitcher drafted in the 1st round of the 1999 MLB draft by the Chicago White Sox.

References

Schools in Clark County, Kentucky
Public high schools in Kentucky
Educational institutions established in 1963
1963 establishments in Kentucky
Winchester, Kentucky